Haigler House is a historic home located near Cameron, Calhoun County, South Carolina with approximately fifteen acres of land. It was built in 1893 by Thomas Shadrack Haigler, and is a simple two-story, frame, Queen Anne style farmhouse accentuated with Folk Victorian decorative details.  The house features approximately 3,000 square feet of exterior porches with decorative spindlework and carved brackets. The property also includes an ice house, a spring house, and a chicken coop / pony stall. Cotton fields surround the house and are still cultivated today.

Thomas Haigler inherited 910 acres of land from his father in the later part of the 19th century and then purchased 305 additional acres. He built the home on this property and lived there with his first wife, Frances, and their seven children. When Frances died in 1913, he remarried and had another four children with his second wife, Agnes. They raised all 11 children in the house. In the 1920s, Haigler had financial troubles and he mortgaged off parcels of the land. By 1927, all of the property was auctioned off and purchased by the Bank of Cameron. In the late 1940s, 43 acres including the house were bought by A.W. Stanfield and were in the Stanfield family until 1996.
It was listed in the National Register of Historic Places in 2001.

References

Houses on the National Register of Historic Places in South Carolina
Queen Anne architecture in South Carolina
Houses completed in 1893
Houses in Calhoun County, South Carolina
National Register of Historic Places in Calhoun County, South Carolina
1893 establishments in South Carolina